Ahmed Abdulrahman Al-Arbeed is a Kuwaiti fencer. He competed in the individual and team foil events at the 1976 Summer Olympics, and had a record of 1-17.

References

External links
 

Year of birth missing (living people)
Living people
Kuwaiti male foil fencers
Olympic fencers of Kuwait
Fencers at the 1976 Summer Olympics